Huang Shigong is  a semi-mythological figure and a Taoist hermit who lived between the Qin Dynasty and Han Dynasty. He gave Zhang Liang a treatise on military strategy called Huang Shigong San Lue (The Three Strategies of Huang Shigong), and the Lingqijing divination manual that allowed Zhang Liang to transform into an adept statesmen and powerful war theorist.

Legend

As a wanted man by the government, Zhang Liang travelled to Xiapi and stayed there for some time, using fake identities to evade the authorities. One day, Zhang Liang took a stroll at Yishui Bridge and met an old man there. The man walked towards Zhang Liang and chucked his shoe down the bridge on purpose, after which he yelled at Zhang, "Hey boy, go down and fetch me my shoe!" Zhang Liang was astonished and unhappy but obeyed silently. The old man then lifted his foot and ordered Zhang Liang to put on the shoe for him. Zhang Liang was furious but he controlled his temper and meekly obliged. The man did not show any sign of gratitude and walked away laughing.

The old man came back after walking a distance and praised Zhang Liang, "This child can be taught!" and asked Zhang Liang to meet him at the bridge again at dawn five days later. Zhang Liang was confused but agreed. Five days later, Zhang Liang rushed to the bridge at the stroke of dawn but the old man was already waiting for him there. The old man chided him, "How can you be late for a meeting with an elderly man? Come back again five days later!" Zhang Liang tried his best to be punctual the second time but the old man still arrived earlier than him, and he was scorned by the old man once more and told to return again five days later. The third time, Zhang Liang went to the bridge at midnight and waited until the old man appeared. This time, the old man was impressed with Zhang Liang's fortitude and humility, that he presented Zhang with a book, saying, "You can become the tutor of a ruler after reading this book. Within ten years, the world will become chaotic. You can then use your knowledge from this book to bring peace and prosperity to the empire. Meet me again 13 years later. I'm the yellow rock at the foot of Mount Gucheng."

The old man was Huang Shigong. The book was titled The Art of War by Taigong and believed to be the Six Secret Teachings by Jiang Ziya, while some called it Three Strategies of Huang Shigong. In legend, Zhang Liang returned to the indicated site 13 years later and did see a yellow rock there. He built a shrine to worship the rock and the rock was buried with him after his death.

Worship
Huang Shigong is worshipped as a deity in Chinese folk religion and Taoism.

In popular culture
 Huangshi Village, also known as Yellow Stone Village in Wulingyuan, Zhangjiajie, Hunan Province, it was named after Huang Shigong.

References

Chinese gods
Folklore characters
Heroes in mythology and legend
Taoist mythology